Radka Yordanova Stoyanova (born 7 July 1964 in Varna) is a Bulgarian rower.

References

External links
 

1964 births
Living people
Bulgarian female rowers
Sportspeople from Varna, Bulgaria
Rowers at the 1988 Summer Olympics
Olympic silver medalists for Bulgaria
Olympic rowers of Bulgaria
Olympic medalists in rowing
Medalists at the 1988 Summer Olympics